The Aldo Leopold Legacy Trail System is a system of 42 state trails in the state of Wisconsin, covering a total of 1728 miles.  It was named after conservationist and influential University of Wisconsin professor Aldo Leopold.  The trail system was created on November 20, 2007, when Governor Jim Doyle signed Senate Bill 161, and dedicated on June 4, 2009.

The trails have features that enable users to learn about the surrounding ecosystems and environments.

Trails
400 State Trail
Ahnapee State Trail
Badger State Trail
Bearskin State Trail
Buffalo River State Trail
Burlington-Kansasville State Trail
Capital City State Trail
Cattail State Trail
Chippewa River State Trail
Devil's River State Trail
Eisenbahn State Trail
Elroy-Sparta State Trail
Fox River State Trail
Friendship State Trail
Gandy Dancer State Trail
Glacial Drumlin State Trail
Great River State Trail
Green Circle State Trail
Hank Aaron State Trail
Hillsboro State Trail
Ice Age National Scenic Trail
La Crosse River State Trail
Mascoutin Valley State Trail
Military Ridge State Trail
Mountain-Bay State Trail
Newton Blackmour State Trail
Nicolet State Trail
North Country National Scenic and State Trail
Oconto River State Trail
Old Abe State Trail
Pecatonica State Trail
Red Cedar State Trail
Saunders State Trail
Stower Seven Lakes State Trail
Sugar River State Trail
Tomorrow River State Trail
Tuscobia State Trail
White River State Trail
Wild Goose State Trail
Wild Rivers State Trail
Wiouwash State Trail
Wolf River State Trail

References

External links 
Aldo Leopold Legacy Trail System
Aldo Leopold Legacy Center

Protected areas of Wisconsin
Hiking trails in Wisconsin